Guatemalan Dogo (Dogo Guatemalteco), formerly known as the Guatemalan Bull Terrier, is a mastiff-type dog breed originating in Guatemala. It is neither recognized by the Fédération Cynologique Internationale (FCI) nor the American Kennel Club (AKC). However, it has the official national recognition of the Asociación Canofila Guatemalteca (ACANGUA) where it belongs to the Group 2.2.1 - Mastiffs. As a unique breed originating in Guatemala, it is also the national dog of the country. It has been introduced to some other countries.

History 
The breed was created from crosses between the old type Bull Terrier, Boxer, and Dalmatian at the end of the 19th century. The two most remarkable breeders in the early history were the family Gerardi in the 1910s and the family Gallusser in the 1930s. Because of the significant Bull Terrier influence and similar appearance (the original Bull Terrier resembled more Latin American Dogos than the modern breed does), in the 20th century it was called Bullterrier Guatemalteco. Finally at the end of the 20th century, the ACANGUA officially changed the name to the Dogo Guatemalteco. Although the ACANGUA published the first official standard already in 1972, the FCI has still not considered international recognition of the breed; however, the American Dog Federation recognizes the Guatemalan Dogo and recognizes the ACANGUA standard as the official standard. The Guatemalan Dog is categorized in working group 6.

Appearance 
The Guatemalan Dogo is a type of mastiff. It is a medium-sized, robust, strong and agile dog with an appearance similar to the Dogo Argentino and the Dogue Brasileiros - however, these breeds are not closely related, but only share partially same ancestors. Males are 54 – 60 cm tall and weigh 40 – 45 kg; females 52 – 58 cm tall and weigh 35 – 40 kg. The short, shiny coat has a smooth and hard texture. The colour must always be white in the body, but in the head markings or spots of any other colour are preferred (although not required).

Behaviour 
The Guatemalan Dogo is fearless, balanced and stable. Towards its family, it is obedient, tranquil, loyal, and affectionate. However, it is reserved and alert towards strangers and will usually accept only the friends of the family. It is very territorial and has a strong guarding instinct.

See also
 Dogs portal
 List of dog breeds

References 

Mastiffs
Catch dogs
Dog breeds originating in Guatemala
Rare dog breeds